tripleC: Communication, Capitalism & Critique is a biannual peer-reviewed open access academic journal covering communication studies, media studies, sociology of technology/communication/media/culture, critical digital sociology, information science/studies and political economy of media/communication/culture/Internet from the perspective of critical theory. tripleC is an open access journal focused on the critical study of capitalism and communication.  It was established in 2003 as tripleC: Cognition, Communication, Cooperation. Journal for a Global Sustainable Information Society, obtaining its current name in 2013. It is published in the  United Kingdom as not-for-profit project The editors-in-chief are Christian Fuchs (University of Westminster) and Marisol Sandoval (City University London). The journal uses the Creative Commons CC-BY-NC-ND licence for its content.

References

External links

Publications established in 2003
Biannual journals
English-language journals
Information science journals
Media studies journals
Open access journals
Sociology journals